The 2014 Metro Atlantic Athletic Conference men's basketball tournament was held March 6–10 at the MassMutual Center in Springfield, Massachusetts. The winner of the tournament, Manhattan, received the conference's automatic bid into the 2014 NCAA tournament. The regular season champion, Iona, received an automatic bid into the 2014 NIT Tournament.

Seeds
All 11 teams in the conference participate in the Tournament. The top five teams will receive byes to the quarterfinals. Teams are seeded by record within the conference, with a tiebreaker system to seed teams with identical conference records.

Bracket

References

MAAC men's basketball tournament
Basketball in Springfield, Massachusetts
2013–14 Metro Atlantic Athletic Conference men's basketball season
MAAC Men's Basketball
Basketball competitions in Massachusetts
21st century in Springfield, Massachusetts
College sports tournaments in Massachusetts